Mount Hannah is a mountain in the Mayacamas Mountains of the Northern California Coast Ranges.
It is in Lake County, California.

Location

Mount Hannah is in Lake County, California.
It is one of the mountains in the Cobb Mountain Area, many of which have volcanic origin.
Others are Cobb Mountain, the most dominant, Seigler Mountain and Boggs Mountain.
There are isolated small valleys and basins between the mountain peaks.

The nearest higher neighbor is Cobb Mountain to the south.

Geology

Mount Hannah formed quite quickly during a polarity transition.
It was built up by a number of closely-spaced eruptions.
Three of the dacites in the Mount Hannah sequence have been dated to between 0.90 and 0.92 million years ago.

Notes

Sources

Mountains of Lake County, California
Mayacamas Mountains